
Gmina Szczerców is a rural gmina (administrative district) in Bełchatów County, Łódź Voivodeship, in central Poland.

Villages
Gmina Szczerców contains the villages and settlements of Bednarze, Borowa, Brzezie, Chabielice, Chabielice-Kolonia, Dubie, Dzbanki, Firlej, Grabek, Grudna, Janówka, Józefina, Kieruzele, Kolonia Szczercowska, Kościuszki, Kozłówki, Krzyżówki, Kuźnica Lubiecka, Leśniaki, Lubiec, Lubośnia, Magdalenów, Marcelów, Młynki, Niwy, Osiny, Osiny-Kolonia, Parchliny, Podklucze, Podżar, Polowa, Puszcza, Rudzisko, Stanisławów Drugi, Stanisławów Pierwszy, Szczerców, Szczercowska Wieś, Szubienice, Tatar, Trakt Puszczański, Żabczanka, Zagadki, Załuże and Zbyszek.

Neighbouring gminas
Gmina Szczerców is bordered by the gminas of Kleszczów, Kluki, Rusiec, Rząśnia, Sulmierzyce, Widawa and Zelów.

References
Polish official population figures 2006
Jewish history of Szczerców/Stertzev

Szczercow
Bełchatów County